Drosophila meridiana is a species of fruit fly that is native to North America.

References

meridiana
Diptera of North America
Insects described in 1942